Ardon is a rural locality (a selo) in Klintsy, Bryansk Oblast, Russia. The population was 2,543 as of 2010. There are 52 streets.

Geography 
Ardon is located 6 km southeast of Klintsy (the district's administrative centre) by road. Klintsy is the nearest rural locality.

References 

Rural localities in Klintsovsky District